Mohammad Doroudian is an Iranian writer, historian, researcher and theorist. 

He was born on 1959 in Tehran. He is active in writing the history of the Iran-Iraq War. He holds a BA in History from Shahid Beheshti University. More than seventeen books have been published by Mohammad Doroudian so far. He is one of the elect of the 31st Iran's Book of the Year Awards and the winner of the 8th Holy Defense Year Book Award.

Life and educations
Mohammad Doroudian was born in Tehran, Iran in 1959. He spent elementary school in one of the lower schools of Tehran. But because of the poor financial situation, he was forced to work and earn a living, so he went to night school in the second year of secondary school. Since 1980, his studies were interrupted by his presence in the Iran-Iraq War. In 1987, he was admitted to Shahid Beheshti University, but again due to the war he began his studies with two years delay in 1989. He finally completed his university studies in 1992 and obtained his bachelor's degree in history.

Careers
He has various responsibilities over the years, some of which include:
 Established war historiography section in Islamic Revolutionary Guard Corps
 Designing and organizing the Iran-Iraq war journalistic newsletter project
 Head of the Office of War Studies and Research at the General Staff of the Armed Forces of the Islamic Republic of Iran
 Secretary of the Threats and Coping Group in the Strategic Research Center at the General Staff of the Armed Forces of the Islamic Republic of Iran
 Advisor to the Secretary of the General Staff of the Armed Forces of the Islamic Republic of Iran
 Secretary of Deputy of Defense Secretariat at the Supreme National Security Council
 Editor-in-Chief of the Iran-Iraq War Quarterly Journal (Negin)

Awards
Mohammad Doroudian was one of the elect of the 31st Iran's Book of the Year Awards in 2014 and the winner of the 8th Holy Defense Year Book Award in 2003.

Also, his book "Ravande Payane Jang" was one of the Top Books of the 10th Holy Defense Year Book Award in the field of military research in 2006.

Bibliography
 Beginning to End: A Review of Political-Military Events of the Iran-Iraq War From the Basis of the Iraqi Invasion to the Ceasefire
 The war inevitability
 End of War: Analysis of Political-Military Events of the Iran-Iraq War From Operation Walfajre 10 to the Occupation of Kuwait
 Basic War Questions: A Critique of the Iran-Iraq War
 Iran-Iraq War Analysis: War, Restoration of Stability; An Overview of Military Political Developments from 1980 to 1982
 The Iran-Iraq War, Subjects and Issues
 Khorramshahr to Faw: Military-Political Study of the Iran-Iraq War after Liberation of Khorramshahr to Conquest of the Faw and Liberation of Mehran
 Khorramshahr in a Long War: A Review of Political-Military Events in Khorramshahr Before the Islamic Revolution Till the Invasion of the Iraqi Army and the Epic Report of the City's Bloody Resistance
 Bloody Town to Khorramshahr: Investigation and Military-Political Events of the War From the Basis of the Iraqi Invasion to the Liberation of Khorramshahr
 The process of the end of the war
 Shalamcheh to Halabja: A Study of the Political-Military Events of the conflict with the United States in Persian-Gulf in 1987
 The Causes of Continuing War
 Faw to Shalamcheh: Study of military-political events of the Iran-Iraq war from the end of Operation Walfajre 8 to the end of Operation Karbala 8
 Strategic options for war
 Analyzing the Iran-Iraq War: An Introduction to a Theory
 Battle of East Basra: Design, Command and execute of operation Karbala 5
 Basic issues of war in the published works of the Army and the Corps

Theories
His theories are often about the political and historical events in Iran that he proves those in his books. To understand those better, you must be familiar with Iran's internal history. Some of his most important theories are:
 Mohammad Doroudian with the approval of Ali Shamkhani, rejects betrayal of Abolhassan Banisadr in Iran-Iraq war
 Mohammad Doroudian rejects Ahmad Reza Pourdastan saying, epoch Commander of Islamic Republic of Iran Army Ground Forces, about the direct role of Ali Sayad Shirazi in suppressing Operation Mersad, and the possibility of his assassination because of the People's Mujahedin of Iran's revenge
 Mohammad Doroudian mentions 25 October 1980 as the day of the fall of Khorramshahr instead of 26 October 1980, historically. According to his narrative, the countdown to the fall of Khorramshahr began on 16 October 1980 and ended on 25 October 1980. According to the available documents and reports, the defenders of Khorramshahr fought with zeal until the last moment.

See also
 Majid Gheisari
 Tahereh Saffarzadeh
 Seyyed Mahdi Shojaee
 Ahad Gudarziani
 Masoumeh Abad
 Ahmad Dehqan
 Akbar Sahraee
 Holy Defense Year Book Award
 Saeed Akef
 Hamid Reza Shekarsari

References

External links
 Mohammad Doroudian on Goodreads
 Mohammad Doroudian Book Reviews
 Mohammad Doroudian Books on Gisoom
 Mohammad Doroudian Articles in Persian
 Mohammad Doroudian opinion about United Nations Security Council Resolution 598

1959 births
Living people
Iranian male writers
Writers from Tehran
Persian-language writers
Recipients of the Holy Defense Year Book Award
Iranian people of the Iran–Iraq War
Shahid Beheshti University alumni